Joseph Raymond Hillaire or  Kwul-kwul’tw (1894–1967) was an American Indian sculptor of the Lummi (Lhaq’temish) tribe, known for his carved totem poles in the style of the Coast Salish peoples. In 1961 he carved the Kobe-Seattle Sister City Friendship Pole. Hillaire was the father of Pauline Hillaire Scälla (b. 1929), a well-known art historian and conservator specializing in the art of Northwest Coast peoples.

Joseph Hillaire was an active member of the Bahá’í Faith, serving as a member of his local Spiritual Assembly.

References

1929 births
1967 deaths
Northwest Coast art
Coast Salish woodcarvers
20th-century First Nations sculptors
Canadian male sculptors
20th-century Canadian male artists